Manon is a Welsh, French and Dutch feminine given name.
Its meaning in Welsh is: 'beautiful queen' and in French, it is a diminutive of the name Marie. 
Notable people with the name include:

Manon (artist) (born 1946), Swiss artist
Manon André (born 1986), French rugby player
Manon Arcangioli (born 1994), French tennis player
Manon Balletti (1740–1776), Italian lover of the legendary womanizer Casanova
Manon Barbe, Canadian politician
Manon Barbeau (born 1949), Canadian filmmaker
Manon Blanchet (born 1968), Canadian politician
Manon de Boer (born 1966), Dutch video artist
Manon Bollegraf (born 1964), Dutch tennis player
Manon Boonjumnong (born 1982), Thai boxer
Manon Brunet (born 1996), French fencer
Manon Briand (born 1964), Canadian film director
Manon Capelle, Belgian actress
Manon Carpenter (born 1993), Welsh racing cyclist
Manon Charette (1955–2006), Canadian handball player
Manon Cleary (1942–2011), American painter
Manon Dubé (died 1978), female murder victim
Manon Fokke (born 1976), Dutch Labour Party politician
Manon Gauthier, Montreal politician
Manon Gropius (1916–1935), Austrian muse
Manon Hostens (born 1994), French canoeist
Manon Houette (born 1992), French handball player
Manon Jutras (born 1967), Canadian road cyclist
Manon Kahle (born 1980), American actress
Manon Kirouac (born 1950), Canadian pop singer known as "Anne Renée"
Manon Krieger (born 1993), French badminton player
Manon Lloyd (born 1996), Welsh track cyclist
Manon Massé (born 1963), Canadian politician
Manon Masseurs (born 1974), Dutch swimmer
Manon Melis (born 1986), Dutch footballer
Manon Meunier (born 1996), French politician
Manon Nummerdor-Flier (born 1984), Dutch volleyball player
Manon Perreault (born 1965), Canadian politician
Manon Rasmussen (born 1951), Danish costume designer
Manon Rhéaume (born 1972), Canadian ice hockey goaltender
Manon Roland (1754–1793), French revolutionary
Manon van Rooijen (born 1982), Dutch freestyle swimmer
Manon Steffan Ros (born 1983), Welsh writer
Manon Valentino (born 1990), French cyclist
Manon Vernay (born 1989), French handball player

Fictional characters
 Manon (character), an animated character from children's books, magazines and television
 Manon, the fictional title character of the 1962 novel Manon des sources, by Marcel Pagnol, and subsequent adaptations
 Manon Blackbeak, character from the Throne of Glass Series by New York Times bestselling author Sarah J. Maas
 Manon Chamack, a character from the Miraculous: Tales of Ladybug & Cat Noir animated series
 Manon Lescaut, title character of the 1731 novel by Abbé Prévost

 Manon a French ballet dancing Judoka from Street Fighter 6

References

Welsh feminine given names
French feminine given names
Dutch feminine given names